The Midlands is a private house in Indian Hills, Kentucky in suburban Louisville built 1913–1914; it is listed on the American National Register of Historic Places. It was built for Marion Dumont Belknap, who was the widow of Louisville businessman Morris B. Belknap, who had died in 1910.  It was designed by the Louisville firm of E.T. Hutchings.

It was listed on the National Register in 1983.

References

Houses on the National Register of Historic Places in Kentucky
Colonial Revival architecture in Kentucky
Houses completed in 1914
Houses in Jefferson County, Kentucky
1914 establishments in Kentucky
National Register of Historic Places in Jefferson County, Kentucky
Georgian Revival architecture in Kentucky